Dirk Murray Brinkman (born October 22, 1978) is a Canadian rapper and playwright best known for recordings and performances that combine hip hop music with literature, theatre, and science.

Early life and education
Born in the remote community of Riondel, British Columbia, in a log cabin built by his parents, Brinkman is the eldest of three children of Joyce Murray, a Member of the Parliament of Canada, and Dirk Brinkman, Sr., who is notable for having founded the world's only private company responsible for planting more than one billion trees. Dirk Sr gave Brinkman the honorific nickname "Baba" at birth, because of his son's contemplative, Buddha-like expression. Brinkman's childhood was divided between Vancouver and the Kootenay region of British Columbia.

Brinkman spent his early summers in remote tree planting camps, and began planting trees himself at the age of 15. He worked for his parents' business, Brinkman & Associates Reforestation, for twelve seasons in British Columbia and Alberta, personally planting more than one million trees. During this period he also earned a Bachelor of Arts degree in English literature from Simon Fraser University and a Master of Arts degree in comparative literature from the University of Victoria, Canada. He studied human evolution and primatology with the orangutan researcher Biruté Galdikas and wrote his thesis comparing modern Hip hop freestyle battling with The Canterbury Tales by Geoffrey Chaucer.

Career

Literature rap

Brinkman first gained widespread media attention for his one-man show The Rap Canterbury Tales, devised as a means of re-telling Chaucer's iconic stories for a modern audience. The show premiered at the Edinburgh Festival Fringe in 2004, and the following year Brinkman was sponsored by Cambridge University to perform the show in British secondary schools. The Rap Canterbury Tales was published as an illustrated paperback by Talon Books in 2006.

Brinkman's 2010 follow-up show, Rapconteur, premiered at the Edinburgh Free Fringe and featured hip hop adaptations of Beowulf, the Epic of Gilgamesh, and the Finnish Kalevala.

In 2011, Brinkman premiered The Canterbury Tales Remixed at the Soho Playhouse in New York City. The show combined material from Rapconteur with new adaptations of The Merchant's Tale, The Pardoner's Tale, and The Wife of Bath's Tale and was released as a full-length album in 2012.

Because of his interest in merging hip-hop and classic literature, Brinkman has referred to his style of rap as Lit Hop, which was also the title of his 2006 solo rap album.

Science rap

In 2008, Brinkman was commissioned to write a new rap show about evolution by Mark Pallen, microbiologist and author of The Rough Guide to Evolution. The result was The Rap Guide to Evolution, a hip hop homage to Charles Darwin which Brinkman first performed in Britain for the Darwin bicentennial in February 2009. Because the lyrics were fact-checked for scientific accuracy, Pallen calls it "the first peer-reviewed rap". Brinkman cites Richard Dawkins, David Sloan Wilson, Jared Diamond, Geoffrey Miller, and E. O. Wilson as his influences in writing the show.

The Rap Guide to Evolution premiered at the 2009 Edinburgh Festival Fringe, winning a Fringe First Award from The Scotsman for best new theatre writing. In 2010 the UK's largest biomedical charity, the Wellcome Trust, provided grant funding for Brinkman to make a series of educational music videos based on the show, as a resource for biology teachers. The Rap Guide to Evolution completed a five-month Off-Broadway theatre run in November 2011, for which Brinkman received a 2012 Drama Desk Award nomination for Outstanding Solo Performance, losing to Irish actor Cillian Murphy.

Brinkman has performed selections from The Rap Guide to Evolution on The Rachel Maddow Show and at the Seattle Science Festival, sharing the stage with Jurassic Park palaeontologist Jack Horner and British physicist Stephen Hawking.

In 2010 Brinkman produced a Rationalist Anthem called Off That, attacking various forms of pseudoscience. The song was inspired by the Jay Z track of the same name, which is featured on The Blueprint 3 album. The video for Brinkman's unauthorized remix was released as part of an online science music festival called Geek Pop and was popular with atheist blogs.

Brinkman followed up his Darwin tribute with a sequel show specifically about evolutionary psychology, The Rap Guide to Human Nature, which premiered at the Edinburgh Fringe in 2010. The album features peer review phone messages from David Buss, Olivia Judson, and David Sloan Wilson commenting on the science content in Brinkman's lyrics. In 2012 Human Nature was adapted into a theatre production, Ingenious Nature, which ran off-Broadway from November 2012 through January 2013.

In March 2012, Brinkman was announced as a songwriter-in-residence at the National Institute for Mathematical and Biological Synthesis (NIMBioS) and spent a month at the University of Tennessee Knoxville as a guest of the Institute, along with DJ and music producer Jamie Simmonds. Brinkman later released "The Infomatic EP," a collection of hip-hop songs inspired by computational biology.

Brinkman's next play, Rap Guide to Religion, premiered at the 2014 Edinburgh Fringe, before transferring to the Soho Playhouse for an off-Broadway run in October 2014. The production ran for seven months and was a Time Out New York and New York Times Critics' Pick, as well as receiving a 2015 Drama Desk Award nomination in the category "Unique Theatrical Experience". The show explores theories from the cognitive science of religion and promotes religious naturalism, prompting American Humanist Association magazine to refer to Brinkman as "atheism's best salesman".

In 2015, Brinkman was commissioned by Arizona State University and Randolph M. Nesse to write and produce an album entitled The Rap Guide to Medicine, which communicates themes from evolutionary medicine. Nesse said of the finished project: "This is amazing. I won't need to teach my course, I'll just have students listen to the album!" The album includes songs about Mendelian disease, parasitology, somatic evolution in cancer, mismatch theory, and senescence.

In 2014 and 2016, Brinkman attended the Science of Consciousness conference in Tucson, AZ, performing a Rap Up or daily rap summary of the conference talks on Neuroscience and Philosophy of Mind. Computational neuroscientist Anil Seth saw Brinkman's performances and proposed they collaborate on a new show about the neuroscience of consciousness. Brinkman premiered "Rap Guide to Consciousness" at the 2017 Brighton Fringe, Winnipeg Fringe and Edinburgh Fringe to critical acclaim. The show explores several neurobiological theories of consciousness, including Global Workspace Theory, Integrated Information Theory, and predictive coding, as well as the Philosophical Zombie, Free Will, Materialism, and Memetics.

Environment and ecology rap

Brinkman was commissioned by the WILD Foundation to produce The Rap Guide to Wilderness in 2014. The album was critically acclaimed and features songs about biodiversity, extinction, conservation, habitat loss and trophic cascade.

In 2015 Brinkman's play Rap Guide to Climate Chaos premiered at the Edinburgh Fringe, followed by performances at the COP21 United Nations Climate Change Conference. "Climate Chaos" went on to play-off-Broadway for six months in 2016, and featured Michael E. Mann, Gavin Schmidt, Naomi Oreskes and Bill Nye as talkback speakers. Bill Nye also features on the album version of "Climate Chaos", rapping the chorus of the track "What's Beef", which remixes a Notorious B.I.G. song to discuss climate change denial. Rap Guide to Climate Chaos summarizes the science, politics, and economics of climate change and advocates for a global carbon tax as part of the solution.

In 2016, after the election of Donald Trump, Brinkman worked with Gary Yohe at Wesleyan University, a senior contributor to the Intergovernmental Panel on Climate Change (IPCC) and co-recipient along with Al Gore of the 2007 Nobel Peace Prize, to produce a new song and video entitled "Erosion", summarizing data from the National Climate Assessment on the US-based physical impacts of climate change.

Science comedy

Brinkman and his wife, neuroscientist Dr. Heather Berlin, co-wrote and performed in a science comedy variety show entitled Off The Top at the Edinburgh Fringe in 2014, 2015, and 2017 about the neuroscience of improvisation and freestyle rap.
The Rap Guide to Evolution won the National Center for Science Education's 2013 Friend of Darwin Award.

Controversy

Teachers have also expressed concern about Brinkman's use of strong language and anti-religious sentiments in his educational performances and videos.

Brinkman himself has been described as an "evangelical atheist" and has blogged about his encounters with creationists, both in educational settings and within his own family. He also performed in support of the Military Association of Atheists & Freethinkers Rock Beyond Belief concert alongside Richard Dawkins at Fort Bragg, NC in 2012.

Ingenious Nature was reviewed unfavourably, and Brinkman received criticism for "singling out women in the audience, pointing at them, and rapping about their ovulation cycles," among other things.

The song "Tranquility Bank" from The Rap Guide to Wilderness received a hostile response from some environmentalists because of its assertion that urban living is better for the environment than back-to-the-land movements.

Theatre

 2004: The Rap Canterbury Tales
 2008: The Rebel Cell (co-written with Dizraeli)
 2009: The Rap Guide to Evolution
 2010: Rapconteur
 2010: The Rap Guide to Human Nature
 2011: The Canterbury Tales Remixed
 2012: Ingenious Nature
 2014: The Rap Guide to Religion
 2015: The Rap Guide to Climate Chaos
 2017: The Rap Guide to Consciousness

Discography

 2004: Swordplay
 2004: The Rap Canterbury Tales
 2005: Pandemonium
 2006: Lit-Hop
 2008: Mine the Gap (Mud Sun)
 2008: The Rebel Cell (Mud Sun)
 2009: The Rap Guide to Evolution
 2009: Apocalyptic Utopian Dreams in the Western Wilderness
 2010: Rapconteur
 2010: The Rap Guide to Human Nature
 2011: The Rap Guide to Evolution: Revised
 2011: The Rap Guide to Business
 2012: The Canterbury Tales Remixed
 2012: The Infomatic EP
 2014: The Rap Guide to Wilderness
 2015: The Rap Guide to Medicine
 2015: The Rap Guide to Religion
 2016: The Rap Guide to Climate Chaos
 2017: The Rap Guide to Consciousness
 2019: See From Space

Publications
 The Rap Canterbury Tales, Talon Books 2006
 The Speciation of Rap The Evolutionary Review, Volume 2, March 2011
 Finding 'God' in the Female Orgasm The Evolutionary Review, Volume 3, May 2012
 Darwin On The Mic Evolution, Volume 69, Issue 5

Personal life
Brinkman is married to cognitive neuroscientist and television host Heather Berlin. They have a daughter, Hannah, born in 2013, and a son, Dylan, born in 2016.

References

1978 births
Living people
21st-century Canadian dramatists and playwrights
21st-century Canadian poets
Canadian male rappers
21st-century Canadian rappers
Musicians from Vancouver
People from Nelson, British Columbia
Simon Fraser University alumni
University of Victoria alumni
Writers from Vancouver
Canadian male poets
Canadian male dramatists and playwrights
Canadian atheists
Critics of religions
21st-century Canadian male writers
21st-century Canadian male musicians